Count Béla Serényi de Kis-Serény (16 June 1866 – 14 October 1919) was a Hungarian politician, who served as Minister of Agriculture twice: between 1910–1913 and in 1918.

He was born into a Hungarian noble family in Pest. His parents were Count László Serényi, a landowner in Putnok and Countess Ludmilla Bubna de Littlicz. He finished his studies in the Theresianum, Vienna and studied law in Budapest. He was a member of the House of Magnates, where he supported the government's religion politics in his speeches. Later he politicized in the House of Representatives. He served as Minister of Trade from 1917 to 1918. Serényi left the Party of National Work in 1916.

References
 Magyar Életrajzi Lexikon

1866 births
1919 deaths
Politicians from Budapest
Liberal Party (Hungary) politicians
National Party of Work politicians
Agriculture ministers of Hungary